The following species in the flowering plant genus Heliotropium, the heliotropes, are accepted by Plants of the World Online. A number of species previously in Tournefortia were reassigned to Heliotropium in recent years as molecular methods became available. 

Heliotropium abbreviatum 
Heliotropium acuminatum 
Heliotropium acutiflorum 
Heliotropium adenogynum 
Heliotropium aegyptiacum 
Heliotropium agdense 
Heliotropium albiflorum 
Heliotropium albovillosum 
Heliotropium alii 
Heliotropium ammophilum 
Heliotropium amplexicaule 
Heliotropium anchusanthum 
Heliotropium andrade-limae 
Heliotropium angiospermum 
Heliotropium angustiflorum 
Heliotropium anomalum 
Heliotropium antiatlanticum 
Heliotropium arbainense 
Heliotropium arborescens 
Heliotropium arboreum 
Heliotropium argenteum 
Heliotropium arguzioides 
Heliotropium asperrimum 
Heliotropium astrotrichum 
Heliotropium aucheri 
Heliotropium auro-argenteum 
Heliotropium azzanum 
Heliotropium bacciferum 
Heliotropium balfourii 
Heliotropium baluchistanicum 
Heliotropium benadirense 
Heliotropium biannulatiforme 
Heliotropium biannulatum 
Heliotropium biblianum 
Heliotropium bogdanii 
Heliotropium borasdjunense 
Heliotropium bovei 
Heliotropium brevilimbe 
Heliotropium bucharicum 
Heliotropium buruense 
Heliotropium cabulicum 
Heliotropium calcareum 
Heliotropium caribaeum 
Heliotropium chaudharyanum 
Heliotropium chenopodiaceum 
Heliotropium chorassanicum 
Heliotropium ciliatum 
Heliotropium circinatum 
Heliotropium confertiflorum 
Heliotropium congestum 
Heliotropium coriaceum 
Heliotropium cornutum 
Heliotropium crassifolium 
Heliotropium crispatum 
Heliotropium crispum 
Heliotropium curassavicum 
Heliotropium cuspidatum 
Heliotropium dasycarpum 
Heliotropium dentatum 
Heliotropium denticulatum 
Heliotropium derafontense 
Heliotropium dicricophorum 
Heliotropium digynum 
Heliotropium disciforme 
Heliotropium dissitiflorum 
Heliotropium distantiflorum 
Heliotropium dolosum 
Heliotropium ellipticum 
Heliotropium elongatum 
Heliotropium eremobium 
Heliotropium eremogenum 
Heliotropium erianthum 
Heliotropium eritrichioides 
Heliotropium esfahanicum 
Heliotropium esfandiarii 
Heliotropium europaeum 
Heliotropium fedtschenkoanum 
Heliotropium ferrugineogriseum 
Heliotropium filiflorum 
Heliotropium filifolium 
Heliotropium floridum 
Heliotropium foetidissimum 
Heliotropium formosanum 
Heliotropium fragillimum 
Heliotropium gaubae 
Heliotropium geissei 
Heliotropium genovefae 
Heliotropium gibberosum 
Heliotropium giessii 
Heliotropium gillianum 
Heliotropium glabriusculum 
Heliotropium glabrum 
Heliotropium glutinosum 
Heliotropium gossypii 
Heliotropium gracillimum 
Heliotropium grande 
Heliotropium greuteri 
Heliotropium griffithii 
Heliotropium gypsaceum 
Heliotropium halacsyi 
Heliotropium halame 
Heliotropium harareense 
Heliotropium haussknechtii 
Heliotropium hirsutissimum 
Heliotropium incanum 
Heliotropium inconspicuum 
Heliotropium indicum 
Heliotropium jaffiuelii 
Heliotropium jizanense 
Heliotropium johnstonii 
Heliotropium kaserunense 
Heliotropium kavirense 
Heliotropium keralense 
Heliotropium khayyamii 
Heliotropium krauseanum 
Heliotropium kumense 
Heliotropium kuriense 
Heliotropium kurtzii 
Heliotropium laevigatum 
Heliotropium lamarckii 
Heliotropium lamondiae 
Heliotropium lanceolatum 
Heliotropium laricum 
Heliotropium lasianthum 
Heliotropium lasiocarpum 
Heliotropium leiocarpum 
Heliotropium lignosum 
Heliotropium lilloi 
Heliotropium linariifolium 
Heliotropium lineare 
Heliotropium lippioides 
Heliotropium litvinovii 
Heliotropium longicalyx 
Heliotropium longiflorum 
Heliotropium longistylum 
Heliotropium luteoviride 
Heliotropium luzonicum 
Heliotropium macrodon 
Heliotropium macrolimbe 
Heliotropium macrostachyum 
Heliotropium madurense 
Heliotropium magistri 
Heliotropium makranicum 
Heliotropium mamanense 
Heliotropium mandonii 
Heliotropium maranjonense 
Heliotropium marifolium 
Heliotropium maris-mortui 
Heliotropium megalanthum 
Heliotropium melanochaeta 
Heliotropium mesinanum 
Heliotropium messerschmidioides 
Heliotropium micranthos 
Heliotropium microspermum 
Heliotropium microstachyum 
Heliotropium minutiflorum 
Heliotropium molle 
Heliotropium muelleri 
Heliotropium murinum 
Heliotropium myosotifolium 
Heliotropium myosotoides 
Heliotropium nicotianifolium 
Heliotropium nodulosum 
Heliotropium noeanum 
Heliotropium olgae 
Heliotropium oliganthum 
Heliotropium oliverianum 
Heliotropium ophioglossum 
Heliotropium oxapampanum 
Heliotropium pamparomasense 
Heliotropium pannifolium 
Heliotropium paronychioides 
Heliotropium parvulum 
Heliotropium patagonicum 
Heliotropium paulayanum 
Heliotropium petiolare 
Heliotropium philippianum 
Heliotropium phylicoides 
Heliotropium pileiforme 
Heliotropium pinnatisectum 
Heliotropium piurense 
Heliotropium pleiopterum 
Heliotropium popovii 
Heliotropium pseudoindicum 
Heliotropium pterocarpum 
Heliotropium pueblense 
Heliotropium pycnophyllum 
Heliotropium ramosissimum 
Heliotropium rechingeri 
Heliotropium remotiflorum 
Heliotropium riebeckii 
Heliotropium riedlii 
Heliotropium roigii 
Heliotropium rotundifolium 
Heliotropium rudbaricum 
Heliotropium rufipilum 
Heliotropium ruhanyi 
Heliotropium ruiz-lealii 
Heliotropium rusbyi 
Heliotropium samoliflorum 
Heliotropium saonae 
Heliotropium sarmentosum 
Heliotropium schahpurense 
Heliotropium schreiteri 
Heliotropium schweinfurthii 
Heliotropium scotteae 
Heliotropium selleanum 
Heliotropium seravschanicum 
Heliotropium serpentinicum 
Heliotropium shirazicum 
Heliotropium shoabense 
Heliotropium simile 
Heliotropium sinuatum 
Heliotropium smaragdinum 
Heliotropium sogdianum 
Heliotropium sokotranum 
Heliotropium stamineum 
Heliotropium stenophyllum 
Heliotropium steudneri 
Heliotropium stevenianum 
Heliotropium styligerum 
Heliotropium suaveolens 
Heliotropium submolle 
Heliotropium subspinosum 
Heliotropium sudanicum 
Heliotropium sultanense 
Heliotropium supinum 
Heliotropium szovitsii 
Heliotropium taftanicum 
Heliotropium taltalense 
Heliotropium thermophilum 
Heliotropium tiaridioides 
Heliotropium transalpinum 
Heliotropium trichostomum 
Heliotropium tubulosum 
Heliotropium tzvelevii 
Heliotropium ulei 
Heliotropium ulophyllum 
Heliotropium velutinum 
Heliotropium verdcourtii 
Heliotropium veronicifolium 
Heliotropium viridiflorum 
Heliotropium wagneri 
Heliotropium wissmannii 
Heliotropium zeylanicum 
Heliotropium ziegleri

References

Heliotropium